The Tiger Woman was a 1917 American silent drama film directed by J. Gordon Edwards and George Bellamy and starring Theda Bara. The film is now considered lost.

Plot
Countess Irma (Theda Bara) is a Russian villainess who becomes the ruthless Princess Petrovich, who loves only her pearls. Her husband, the Prince (Edward Roseman), sells state secrets to a spy to pay her exorbitant bills, and her response is to report him to the secret police.

Then she runs off to Monte Carlo with her lover, Count Zerstoff (Emil DeVarney), but she poisons him after he racks up a load of gambling losses. She goes to America followed by Stevan, a disgruntled servant (John Webb Dillion) and there she wreaks more havoc.

The Princess' next victim is Edwin Harris (Glen White). He dumps his fiancée (Florence Martin) for the vamp and steals money from his father (Edward Holt). The shock kills the father and the Princess has Edwin sent off to jail. She next becomes involved with Edwin's brother, Mark (Herbert Heyes), inspiring him to leave his wife (Mary Martin) and child (Kittens Reichert).

Finally Edwin and Stevan (who also has been sent to jail through the Princess' machinations) get away from their confinement and head over to the vamp's. She tries to stab Stevan, but he turns the knife onto herself and she is fatally stabbed. But before she dies she confesses all, which clears the name of both Harris brothers, and Mark returns to his wife.

Cast

Brazil
The film was released in Brazil with title Mulher Tigre on July 26, 1917 at Cine Ideal, situated at the centre of Rua da Carioca 60-62, Rio de Janeiro. It was a hit amongst the Brazilian audience for six weeks and it was also exhibited on Cines Capitolio and Pathé from August 5, 1917. Cine Pathé was a cinema located at Floriano square also called Cinelândia. Cine Ideal belonged to the group Severiano Ribeiro, which still holds in its storehouse a couple of old silent films.

See also
1937 Fox vault fire

References

External links

The Tiger Woman at SilentEra

1917 films
1917 drama films
1917 lost films
Fox Film films
Silent American drama films
American silent feature films
American black-and-white films
Films directed by George Bellamy
Films directed by J. Gordon Edwards
Films shot in New Jersey
Lost American films
Lost drama films
1910s American films